Oleksandr Viktorovich Kobzystyi (born 23 May 2003) is a Ukrainian professional basketball player for Mega Basket of the ABA League and the Basketball League of Serbia.

Early life and career 
Kobzystyi moved to Belgrade, Serbia, in 2019, joining the Mega Basket youth system. He was a member of the Mega U19 rosters that won the Junior ABA League for the 2020–21 and 2021–22 season.

Professional career 
On 28 May 2021, Kobzystyi signed his first professional contract with Mega Basket. In the 2021–22 BLS season, he was load out to OKK Beograd, the Mega Basket affiliate. Over 29 games, he averaged 10.7 points, 4.9 rebounds, and 1.2 assists per game. After the season, he returned to Mega Basket for the 2022–23 season.

National team career 
In August 2019, Kobzystyi was a member of the Ukraine U16 national team at the FIBA U16 European Championship Division B in Podgorica, Montenegro. Over eight tournament games, he averaged 21.8 points, 8.6 rebounds, and 2.6 assists per game.

In July 2021, Kobzystyi was a member of the Ukraine under-20 team at the FIBA U20 European Challengers. Over five tournament games, he averaged 12 points, 3.8 rebounds, and 0.6 assists per game. In July 2022, Kobzystyi was a member of the under-20 team that finished last at the FIBA U20 European Championship in Podgorica, Montenegro. Over seven tournament games, he averaged 14.9 points, 6.1 rebounds, and 1.3 assists per game.

Personal life 
His father is a former basketball player . His father played for Mariupol, Budivelnyk, and Dnipro during his playing days, as well as in Bulgaria and Russia. Also, his father was a member of the Ukraine national team at two EuroBaskets, 2001 and 2005.

See also
 List of foreign basketball players in Serbia

References

External links 
 Oleksandr Kobzystyi at realgm.com
 Oleksandr Kobzystyi at proballers.com
 Oleksandr Kobzystyi at eurobasket.com
 Oleksandr Kobzystyi at aba-liga.com

2003 births
Living people
ABA League players
Basketball League of Serbia players
KK Mega Basket players
OKK Beograd players
Shooting guards
Small forwards
Sportspeople from Poltava Oblast
Ukrainian expatriate basketball people in Serbia
Ukrainian men's basketball players